FBN may refer to:

Broadcasting 
 Faith Broadcasting Network, an American Christian television network
 Fox Business Network, an American cable television network
 Fundamental Broadcasting Network, an American Christian radio network

Other uses 
Farmers Business Network, a farmer-to-farmer network and e-commerce platform
Federal Bureau of Narcotics, a former agency of the United States Department of the Treasury
Feminist Bookstore News, a trade publication for feminist bookstores
 Fibrillin
 First Bank of Nigeria